Kouno may refer to:

Battle of Kouno (1899) battle in Africa of Muslims versus French troops
Kouno, Chad, a sub-prefecture in the Chari-Baguirmi Region of Chad
Kōno, Japanese surname sometimes romanized as Kouno

See also
 Konno
 Kono (disambiguation)